Igor Novikov may refer to:

Igor Novikov (painter) (born 1961), Russian painter living in Switzerland
Igor Novikov (pentathlete) (1929–2007), Soviet Olympic modern pentathlete 
Igor Novikov (chess player) (born  1962), Ukrainian then U.S. chess master
Igor Dmitriyevich Novikov (born 1935), Russian theoretical astrophysicist and cosmologist